Erkin Alptekin (born 4 July 1939) is a Uyghur activist from Germany. Alptekin is the son of Isa Alptekin, who claimed that during 1933–1934, he was the General Secretary of the First East Turkestan Republic in Western China when in reality he was a representative from Xinjiang in the KMT government. He has played very important roles for the foundation of some international organizations, the best known of which are the Unrepresented Nations and Peoples Organization (UNPO) and the World Uyghur Congress.

Biography
After the Peaceful Liberation of Xinjiang in 1949 and succession by the new People's Republic of China, Alptekin's family fled to Srinagar in Jammu and Kashmir. There he attended Catholic school and then Convent College, completing his studies in the Institute of Journalism in Istanbul. Alptekin is based in Germany.

Career
In 1971, due to his father's connections, he got a job at Radio Free Europe/Radio Liberty (RFE/RL) in Munich. He worked as a "Senior Policy Advisor" and directed the Uyghur Division until 1979, when Uyghur-language broadcasts were discontinued for a lack of an audience under RFE/RL jurisdiction. During his time at the Division, he complained about lack of media coverage of the Uyghurs, lamenting "the international community only reacts when conflict breaks out." Concurrently in the 1970s and 1980s, the CIA looked to connect to Uyghur separatists and found Alptekin a suitable match because of his leadership in various Uyghur organizations and his tenure at RFE. He became an adviser to the CIA and retired his RFE/RL post in 1995 as it moved to Prague in the Czech Republic.

Erkin Alptekin has founded various organizations for separatist movements, mostly related to the Uyghur nationalist cause. In 1985 he participated in the founding of the "Allied Committee of the Peoples of East Turkestan, Tibet and Inner Mongolia", which held its first conference in 1998 in New York. He founded the East Turkestan Union in Europe in Europe. In 1991, he also became one of the founders of the Unrepresented Nations and Peoples Organization (UNPO), which has its headquarters in The Hague. During a conference held in Munich  in April 2004 Alptekin was elected the President of the World Uyghur Congress.

Erkin Alptekin has been lobbying, not only for Uyghur nationalism but also for other separatist movements, peoples and minorities, including the indigenous peoples in Western countries since 1971.

Erkin Alptekin is also on the advisory board of several international organizations situated in Asia, Europe and in the United States. For the last 35 years Alptekin has attended more than 6,000 international conferences worldwide on various topics; published numerous articles, research papers and brochures; and has been the focus of several Western press media.

References

1939 births
Living people
Uyghur human rights activists
Chinese anti-communists